Glebe or The Glebe was an electoral district of the Legislative Assembly in the Australian state of New South Wales, originally created in 1859, partly replacing Sydney Hamlets, and named after and including the Sydney suburb of Glebe. It elected one member from 1859 to 1885 and two members from 1885 to 1894. In 1920, with the introduction of proportional representation, it was absorbed into Balmain. Glebe was recreated in 1927 and abolished in 1941.

Members for Glebe

Election results

References

Former electoral districts of New South Wales
1859 establishments in Australia
Constituencies established in 1859
1920 disestablishments in Australia
Constituencies disestablished in 1920
1927 establishments in Australia
Constituencies established in 1927
1941 disestablishments in Australia
Constituencies disestablished in 1941